New Garden is an unincorporated community in Ray County, in the U.S. state of Missouri and part of the Kansas City metropolitan area.

History
A post office called New Garden was established in 1851, and remained in operation until 1883. The community most likely took its name from a nearby church of the same name.

References

Unincorporated communities in Ray County, Missouri
Unincorporated communities in Missouri